The Baron Kinkvervankotsdorsprakingatchdern is an 18th-century comic opera written by English composer Samuel Arnold and English playwright Miles Peter Andrews (died 1814).

The opera was based on a novel by Lady Craven. It was published in London in 1781 and first performed on 9 July 1781 at the Theatre-Royal in the Haymarket.

References

External links
Online libretto

Operas
1781 operas
English-language operas
Operas based on novels
Operas by Samuel Arnold